Lorenz, Lord of Werle-Güstrow (between 1338 and 1340 – between 24 February 1393 and 6 May 1394) was Lord of Werle-Güstrow from 1360 to 1393 (or 1394).  He was the eldest son of Nicholas III, Lord of Werle-Güstrow and Agnes of Mecklenburg.

After his father's death in 1360 or 1361, he initially ruled Werle-Gustrow alone.  After 21 September 1365, he ruled jointly with his brother John V of Werle, as can be inferred from a deed they signed jointly on that date.

John died young, before 9 September 1378.  From that date onwards, documents were again signed by Lorenz alone. Lorenz last signed a deed on 24 February 1393.

Issue
He was married to Matilda (died before 17 December 1402), the daughter of Nicholas IV, Lord of Werle-Goldberg. They had the following children:
 Balthasar, lord of Werle-Güstrow,
 John VII, co-lord of Werle-Güstrow,
 William, Lord of Werle-Güstrow.

External links
 Biographical data about Lorenz on emecklenburg.de
 Genealogical table of the House of Mecklenburg

Lords of Werle
14th-century German nobility
1330s births
1390s deaths